István Mészáros (born 26 November 1967) is a Hungarian weightlifter. He competed in the men's light heavyweight event at the 1992 Summer Olympics.

References

1967 births
Living people
Hungarian male weightlifters
Olympic weightlifters of Hungary
Weightlifters at the 1992 Summer Olympics
Sportspeople from Budapest